Ramona Roth (born 7 March 1977) is a German cross-country skier who competed from 1995 to 2002. She has won a bronze medal in the 4 × 5 km relay at the 1999 FIS Nordic World Ski Championships in Ramsau, and had her best finish of 18th in the 5 km event at the 1997 FIS Nordic World Ski Championships.

Roth has five individual career victories up to 10 km from 1996 to 2001.

Cross-country skiing results
All results are sourced from the International Ski Federation (FIS).

World Championships
 1 medal – (1 bronze)

a.  Cancelled due to extremely cold weather.

World Cup

Season standings

Team podiums
 1 podium

a.  1999 World Championship races are included in the 1998–99 World Cup scoring system.

References

External links

1977 births
German female cross-country skiers
Living people
FIS Nordic World Ski Championships medalists in cross-country skiing